Metamorphopsia (from) is a type of distorted vision in which a grid of straight lines appears wavy and parts of the grid may appear blank. People can first notice they suffer with the condition when looking at mini-blinds in their home. For example, straight lines might be wavy or bendy. Things may appear closer or further than they are.

Initially characterized in the 1800s, metamorphopsia was described as one of the primary and most notable indications of myopic and senile maculopathies. Metamorphopsia can present itself as unbalanced vision, resulting from small unintentional movements of the eye as it tries to stabilize the field of vision. Metamorphopsia can also lead to the misrepresentation of an object’s size or shape.

It is mainly associated with macular degeneration, particularly age-related macular degeneration with choroidal neovascularization. Other conditions that can present with complaints of metamorphopsia include: pathological myopia, presumed ocular histoplasmosis syndrome, choroidal rupture and multifocal choroiditis.

Pathology 

The mechanisms that result in the development of metamorphopsia involve structural changes in the retina of the eye (retinal mechanism) as well as processing changes in the cerebral cortex of the brain (cortical mechanism). The retinal mechanism involves the displacement of retinal layers which results in the mislocation of light on the retina. The cortical mechanism, which was discovered after the retinal mechanism, is affected by perceptual “filling-in” and visual crowding effects. The cortical mechanism was found to work in combination with the retinal mechanism to contribute to metamorphopsia in long-standing maculopathy or after the treatment of macular disorders.

Causes of Metamorphopsia 

Metamorphopsia can be a symptom of a number of eye disorders involving the retina or macula. Some of these conditions include the following:

 Age-related macular degeneration
 Epiretinal membrane and vitreomacular traction
 Posterior vitreous detachment
 Macular hole

Diagnosis 
Tests used for diagnosis of Metamorphopsia mostly make use of subjective assessments of how a person views regular patterns. Many of these tests have a poor ability to accurately diagnose or identify a person with the disease (i.e.,poor sensitivity). The use of assessments such as a psychophysical test called preferential hyperacuity perimetry, which assesses a person’s ability to any misalignments of visual objects, may permit a more sensitive diagnosis of Metamorphopsia.

Treatment and Prognosis 

Metamorphopsia is a symptom of several common retinal and macular diseases, therefore treating the underlying disorder can improve symptoms. For people who have conditions such as Epiretinal membrane (ERM), Macular Holes and Retinal Detachment, decreased metamorphopsia is associated with an increase in visual acuity. Quantitative evaluation of metamorphopsia is an important step in understanding visual functions of individuals with macular disorders and is an essential tool for physicians in evaluating treatment results.

See also 
 Dysmorphopsia
 Hallucination

References

Visual disturbances and blindness